is a Japanese jidaigeki or period drama that was broadcast in prime-time from 1977 to 1978. It is 11th in the Hissatsu series.

Plot

Cast
Masaomi Kondō as Ranbei(Takano Chōei)
Ken Ogata as Andō Hiroshige
Isuzu Yamada as Oen
Judy Ongg 
Gannosuke Ashiya as Burahei

References

1977 Japanese television series debuts
1970s drama television series
Jidaigeki television series